The 1975 Arizona State Sun Devils football team represented Arizona State University in the 1975 NCAA Division I football season.  The offense scored 347 points, while the defense allowed 127 points. Led by head coach Frank Kush, the Sun Devils were undefeated in the regular season (11–0), perfect in Western Athletic Conference play (7–0), and won the Fiesta Bowl. After beating  Nebraska, 17–14, Kush said, "From the players' standpoint, this was probably the most important game since I have been here.  Not only was the game important for the recognition this team will receive, but it also helps gain recognition for the great teams and players we have had here in the past."  They finished the season (12–0) overall and were ranked # 2 in both the AP Poll and the Coaches Poll. On January 17, 1976 Sporting News Ranked ASU as the #1 team in College Football for the 1975 season. This was the only poll that recognized ASU as the National Champions. This remains the highest ranked finish in Arizona State football history in both the AP and Coaches Poll.

Schedule

Roster

Game summaries

Arizona

1975 team players in the NFL
The following players were claimed in the 1976 NFL Draft.

References

Arizona State
Arizona State Sun Devils football seasons
Western Athletic Conference football champion seasons
Fiesta Bowl champion seasons
College football undefeated seasons
Arizona State Sun Devils football